Tobias van den Hurk is a Dutch curler. He currently plays lead on the Dutch men's curling team skipped by Wouter Gösgens.

Personal life
As of 2018, he was a computer science engineering student at Delft University of Technology.

Teams

References

External links

Living people
Dutch male curlers
Sportspeople from South Holland
People from Zoetermeer
2000s births
Delft University of Technology alumni
21st-century Dutch people